Mbombela United FC is a community soccer team based in the Mpumalanga provincial of Mbombela, formerly known as Nelspruit.
It plays in the National first Division of South Africa. The team was established in 2010 and is wholly owned by the Matsebula brothers, Skhumbuzo and Oupa who are prominent business people in the transport and property sector. It is popularly known as Tingwenyama which means pride of lions in the local SiSwati language. Since its formation, the team has been given first priority for talent showcase to young boys from around the Mpumalanga province more especially from the Lowveld. During the 2012/13 season, The Mbombela United FC won the Mpumalanga provincial SAFA League then known as Vodacom league under the guidance of caretaker coach, Lesego Matsomela and represented the province but failed to qualify for an NFD spot. 

During the 2014/15 season, Mbombela United once again won the SAFA provincial league for Mpumalanga, now known as the Motsepe league under the guidance of Mfanimphela “Mphela” Maseko to be the first team to win the ABC Motsepe League Championships after dismissing Mthatha Bucks by 2 goals to 1 in the finals courtesy of goals by Isaac Nana and Inky Masuku.

In its first NFD campaign, Mbombela United put on a tough contention for automatic promotion but eventually managed to secure a Premier League playoffs spot under the mentorship of Vusi Phillip Mkatshwa but failed to qualify for a spot in the Premier Soccer League. The club is sponsored by the biggest commuter transport company in the Lowveld area, Buscor Pvt Ltd and uses KaNyamazane and Mbombela Stadium as its home ground.

In July 2015, they won promotion to the National First Division.

Honours 

SAFA Second Division: 2014–15

Notes

References 

Soccer clubs in South Africa
Association football clubs established in 2010
National First Division clubs
2010 establishments in South Africa